Tongguan railway station is a railway station of Longhai railway located in Tongguan County, Weinan, Shaanxi, China.

The station is the easternmost station operated by CR Xi'an on Longhai railway.

History 
The station was opened in 1931.

References 

Railway stations in Shaanxi
Stations on the Longhai Railway
Railway stations in China opened in 1931